Portaulun may be,

Portaulun people
Portaulun language